Karns Quality Foods, also known as Karns Prime & Fancy Food, Ltd., is a privately owned supermarket chain in the Harrisburg metropolitan area of Pennsylvania.  The company's corporate headquarters is in Mechanicsburg.

History
Karns Quality Foods was founded in 1959 by David L. Karns and has been operated continuously by the Karns family since then.  The company was founded in the form of a butcher shop in New Cumberland, but the current format is a traditional grocery store with an emphasis on perishable items. Karns stores also have a selection of fresh local produce and fresh baked goods.

In September 2006, Karns Quality Foods acquired the remaining store locations of Fox's Markets, a grocery chain that was based in Dauphin County, Pennsylvania. The addition of Fox's locations in Middletown and Hershey gave Karns a total of eight stores.  In 2019, the ninth store was opened in the site of a former Darrenkamp's which closed in 2018.
In December 2021, a tenth store was opened in Duncannon, previously operated by Mutzabaugh's.

The Central Penn Business Journal ranked Karns Quality Foods as the 35th largest privately held corporation in central Pennsylvania in 2013. In 2009, it was ranked one of the 10 largest privately held companies in Cumberland County.

Operations
Karns operates nine stores in central Pennsylvania: Lower Paxton Township, Lemoyne, Hampden Township, Boiling Springs, New Bloomfield, Middletown, Carlisle, Newberry Township, and Hershey. The current CEO is the founder's son, D. Scott Karns.

References

External links 
 Official website

Supermarkets of the United States
Companies based in Cumberland County, Pennsylvania
American companies established in 1959
Retail companies established in 1959
1959 establishments in Pennsylvania